Confession is a 2019 South Korean television series starring Lee Jun-ho, Shin Hyun-been and Yoo Jae-myung. It aired on tvN from March 23 to May 12, 2019.

Synopsis
Choi Do-hyun becomes a lawyer in order to clear his father's name after he has been wrongly accused of murder.

Cast

Main
 Lee Jun-ho as Choi Do-hyun
Yoo Jae-myung as Gi Choon-ho
 Shin Hyun-bin as Ha Yoo-ri
Nam Gi-ae as Madame Jin

Supporting

People around Choi Do-hyun
 Choi Kwang-il as Choi Pil-su
 Lee Ki-hyuk as Lee Hyun-joon

People around Gi Choon-ho
 Jung Hee-tae as Detective Seo
 Jang Jae-ho as Detective Lee
 Jeon Do-hyun as Kim Dae-seok

Others
 Moon Sung-keun as Cho Myung-geun
 Song Young-chang as Chairman Oh
 Yoo Sung-joo as Ji Chang-ryul
 Kim jung-gi as Yang In-beom
 Kim Young-hoon as Park Si-kang
 Choi Dae-hoon as Secretary Hwang
 Kim Jung-hwa as Jenny Song
 Ryu Kyung-soo as Han Jong-goo
 Song Yoo-hyun as Cho Gyeong-seon
 Jeong Gi-seop as Cha Seung-hu
 Kim Seong-hun as Sung Jun-sik
 Yoon Kyung-ho as Heo Jae-man
 Tae In-ho

Production
The first script reading of the cast was held on January 5, 2019.

Original soundtrack

Part 1

Part 2

Part 3

Ratings

Awards and nominations

References

External links
  
  
 

Korean-language television shows
2019 South Korean television series debuts
2019 South Korean television series endings
TVN (South Korean TV channel) television dramas
South Korean legal television series
Television series by Studio Dragon